The Chilean port of Quintero and adjacent Puchuncaví have made themselves known for their pollution in the 2010s and 2020s. They have together been characterized as a sacrifice zone. The zone hosts the coal-fired Ventanas Power Plant, an oil refinery, a cement storage, Fundición Ventanas, a copper foundry and refinery, a lubricant factory and a chemical terminal. In total 15 polluting companies operate in the area. 

In 1992 there was a judicial appeal filed by five women from Puchuncavi against Fundición Ventanas and Chilgener, this was filed against the refinery for the toxic clouds it emitted. In areas near the polluting industries, testing in 1997 showed high levels copper in the soil. High level of selenium and copper were also found in rainwater near the industries. In 2011, Escuela La Greda located in Puchuncaví, was engulfed in a chemical cloud from the Ventanas Industrial Complex. The sulfur cloud poisoned an estimated 33 children and 9 teachers, resulting in the relocation of the school. The old location of the school is now abandoned. In August and September 2018 there was a public health crisis in Quintero and Puchuncaví, where over 300 people experienced illness from toxic substances in the air, coming from the polluting industries.

In 2022 the environmental conditions of Quintero, Puchuncaví and Concón were discussed in the Senate of Chile.

In June 2022 President Gabriel Boric announced Codelco's decision to beggin a closure process of Fundición Ventanas.

References

Pollution in Chile
Valparaíso Region